St. Cloud State University (SCSU) is a public university in St. Cloud, Minnesota. Founded in 1869, the university is one of the largest institutions in the Minnesota State Colleges and Universities system. Its enrollment in 2020 was approximately 16,000 students and it has over 120,000 alumni.

History
St. Cloud State opened in 1869 as Third State Normal School. The school was one building, the Stearns House, a renovated hotel purchased by the state Legislature for $3,000. The five-member faculty was headed by Principal Ira Moore. Of the 53 original students, 43 were women. As the number of female students increased, Stearns House was completely transformed into a women's dormitory in 1874; male students organized a boarding club where they located a house near campus, overseen by a matron.

In 1898, the school offered a junior college curriculum. In 1914, the school dropped its secondary education program. The Legislature authorized a name change in 1921 to St. Cloud State Teachers College. In 1957, the word "Teachers" was deleted. The first bachelor's degrees were awarded in 1925. Master's degree programs were first offered in 1953.

In 1975, St. Cloud State became a university, comprising five colleges and a graduate school. In 1987, men's hockey became an NCAA Division I program. Two years later the team moved into a new two-rink arena called the National Hockey Center.

Applied doctoral degrees were first offered in 2007.

Previous school names
 St. Cloud Normal School 1869–1921
 St. Cloud State Teachers College 1921–1957
 St. Cloud State College 1957–1975
 St. Cloud State University 1975–present

Presidents

Academics

The university offers more than 200 majors, minors and pre-professional programs in six colleges and schools.

SCSU is the only Minnesota university that offers an Accreditation Board for Engineering and Technology (ABET) accredited manufacturing engineering program. It also offers ABET-accredited electrical engineering, mechanical engineering and computer science programs. The Master of engineering management is the only Minnesota program certified by the American Society of Engineering Management.

The School of Graduate Studies offers more than 60 graduate programs and certificates, including specialist, Master of Arts, Master of Business Administration, Master of Engineering Management, Master of Music and Master of Science. Ed.D. doctoral degrees are offered in Higher Education Administration and Educational Administration and Leadership.

Colleges and schools
St. Cloud State offers more than 200 undergraduate, more than 60 graduate programs and three doctoral programs of study in eight colleges and schools.

Student organizations

At the start of each academic year students are invited to "Mainstreet," a showcase for student organizations, campus services and community connections. Students are encouraged to participate in its more than 250 student organizations, including the Investment Club, which runs a student-managed investment portfolio.

Students can join one of nine Greek houses.

Student media

KVSC 88.1 FM is an educational public radio station licensed to SCSU. The station started on May 10, 1967, and expanded broadcasting times in September 1994. Among other things, KVSC is renowned for its 50-hour trivia contest, which dates back to 1980, and community events, such as Granite City Radio Theatre.

UTVS is the school's broadcast television station, airing student-produced content on Charter Channel 180 24/7. The station has a variety of shows, including "Husky Mag", "Crunch Time", "Husky Tonight", "Monday Night Live", "The Culture", "UTVS News En Espanol", "Faking News", and its flagship broadcast "UTVS News". Husky Productions, responsible for broadcasting hockey games at the HBNHC, also sometimes airs on UTVS.

Student governance
Student Government plays an advisory role in campus governance and a management role in distributing student-fee dollars to student organizations and campus units. Notably, it allocates funding for athletics, technology and Student Legal Services for students. The Student Government president meets regularly with the university president.

Ballots allow students to vote on leadership positions, senator positions and advisory resolutions. The president and vice president are Surkhel Yousafzai and Betty Asefaw.

Students pay a $0.61 per credit fee to fund Students United, a student-led, nonprofit advocacy organization for Minnesota State Colleges and Universities System students.

Athletics

SCSU has 19 NCAA Division II teams and is a member of the Northern Sun Intercollegiate Conference. The team name is the Huskies, represented by Blizzard, the mascot. In 2014, the university updated its secondary logo, which features a Husky dog face. In December 2019 SCSU announced it was discontinuing the men's football team and men's and women's golf. To remain in compliance with Title IX, the university is adding a men's soccer team.

Ice hockey

Men's and women's ice hockey teams compete in NCAA Division I. Men's Hockey is in the NCHC, and Women's Hockey is in the WCHA.

In the 1986–87 season, Herb Brooks, the 1980 USA men's Olympic hockey coach, became the coach of the Huskies and helped men's hockey attain NCAA Division I status. That season he led the Huskies to a 25–10–1 record and a third-place trophy at the NCAA Division III Men's Ice Hockey Championship. He also guided efforts to build the two-rink arena, Herb Brooks National Hockey Center, that now bears his name. In 2001, the men's team won the WCHA post-season tournament, symbolized by the Broadmoor Trophy.

In 1998, the university added a women's hockey team at the NCAA Division I level.

Men's Huskies Hockey has earned 19 NCAA Men's Ice Hockey Championship appearances. The team advanced to the 2013 Frozen Four. The 2012–13 team's co-captain Drew LeBlanc was named WCHA Player of the Year and earned numerous national honors, including the Hobey Baker Award, the most prestigious award in men's college hockey. The 2013 team also earned a share of the WCHA league title and the MacNaughton Cup. The 2014 team earned the Penrose Cup, league title trophy for the inaugural season of the NCHC. In 2016 the team won the NCHC post-season tournament, the Frozen Faceoff. In 2018, the team won the NCHC regular-season title, the Penrose Cup, with a 16-4-4 record.

Wrestling

Huskies Wrestling won the NCAA Wrestling Championship in 2020, 2019, 2018, 2016 and 2015 and placed second in 2017, 2013, 2012, and 2011.

Basketball

From 1982-90, Women's Huskies Basketball dominated the North Central Conference, compiling a 179-58 record in that timespan and advancing three times to the NCAA Women's Division II Basketball Tournament quarterfinals. SCSU won the NSIC Championship in 2020, winning the title for the second time in program history and the first time since 2009.

Men's Huskies basketball, created in 1901, made 10 NCAA Men's Division II Basketball Tournament appearances. The Huskies advanced to a 2010 semifinal, losing 76–70 to Indiana University of Pennsylvania. They finished 29–6 that season.

Notable alumni
Grayce Kaneda Uyehara – national director of the Japanese American Citizens League Legislative Education Committee during lobbying efforts for the Civil Liberties Act of 1988, which issued an apology for Japanese-American internment during World War II and paid reparations to surviving former internees.
John Stumpf – former Chairman, CEO and president of Wells Fargo & Company
 James B. Bullard – President and CEO of the Federal Reserve Bank of St Louis
 Christine L. Clouser – American virologist 
 Clarence L. Gunter - Businessman and Minnesota state representative
 Bonnie Henrickson – women's basketball coach at University of California, Santa Barbara
 Jim Graves – founder, chairman and CEO of Graves Hospitality Corporation
 David Frederickson – Commissioner of the Minnesota Department of Agriculture 
 Jodi Huisentruit – television news anchor who went missing in Iowa June 27, 1995
 Dorothy Houston Jacobson – Assistant Secretary of Agriculture, 1964–1969
 Haley Kalil – Sports Illustrated Swimsuit Issue model and Miss Minnesota USA 
 Jessica Kresa – TNA professional wrestler known as ODB.
 Leo Kottke – Grammy-nominated finger-style acoustic guitar virtuoso with a four-decade recording career
 Warren Limmer – A Minnesota politician and member of the Minnesota Senate representing the 34th District, which includes portions of Hennepin County in the northwestern Twin Cities metropolitan area. Limmer previously served in the Minnesota House of Representatives.
 Win Borden - Minnesota State Senator, Senate 1971-72 (District 53); Senate 1973-78 (District 13)
 Harold J. Nevin, Jr. – U.S. National Guard general
 H. Timothy ("Tim") Vakoc – first U.S. military chaplain to die from wounds received in the Iraq War.
 Terrence "Lee" Zehrer – American entrepreneur and internet pioneer. Founder of one of the first online dating services, Kiss.com.
 Richard Dean Anderson – actor (MacGyver)
 Dan Bakkedahl – actor (The Heat, Legit)
 John Hawkes – Oscar-nominated film and television actor 
 Billy Flynn – film and television actor 
 Jim Pehler - Minnesota state legislator and educator

Athletes
 Tyler Arnason – professional hockey player
 Jonny Brodzinski – professional hockey player, New York Rangers
 Todd Bouman – National Football League quarterback
 Logan Clark – wrestler and mixed martial artist
 Matt Cullen, professional hockey player with the Nashville Predators, Olympian and Stanley Cup winner with the Carolina Hurricanes, Stanley Cup winner with Pittsburgh Penguins (2016)
 Jim Eisenreich – MLB outfielder/first baseman with Tourette syndrome
 Nic Dowd – professional hockey player
 Ben Nelson – wide receiver for the San Jose SaberCats of the Arena Football League
 Van Nelson – 1968 Olympic track and field athlete, 5k and 10k winner at the 1967 Pan American Games
 Jeff Finger – professional hockey player, Toronto Maple Leafs, Colorado Avalanche
 Kevin Gravel – professional hockey player, Los Angeles Kings
 Andrew Gordon – professional hockey player with the Philadelphia Flyers/Lehigh Valley Phantoms
 Ben Hanowski – professional hockey player, Calgary Flames
 Mark Hartigan – professional hockey player, HC CSKA Moscow, Detroit Red Wings
 Bret Hedican – professional hockey player, Olympian and Stanley Cup winner.
 Lawrence Heinemi – professional wrestler who competed as Lars Anderson
 Nick Jensen – professional hockey player, Detroit Red Wings
 Drew LeBlanc – professional hockey player, Chicago Blackhawks
 Matt Hendricks – professional hockey player, Edmonton Oilers, Washington Capitals
 Bob Kronenberg – professional football player, Toronto Argonauts, Rhein Fire
 Charlie Lindgren – professional hockey player, Montreal Canadiens
 Ryan Malone – professional hockey player, Pittsburgh Penguins, Tampa Bay Lightning, Hartford Wolf Pack
 Heather Miller-Koch – 2016 Olympic track and field athlete, heptathlon
 Bob Motzko – men's hockey head coach at University of Minnesota 
 Joe Motzko – professional hockey player, EC Red Bull Salzburg
 Andreas Nödl – professional hockey player, Lausanne HC, Philadelphia Flyers
 Keith Nord – professional football player, Minnesota Vikings 
 Mark Parrish – professional hockey player, Minnesota Wild, Buffalo Sabres
 Steve Martinson – professional hockey player, head coach and general manager of the Allen Americans

Notable faculty and staff
 Mildred L. Batchelder – namesake of the ALA award given to the publisher of a translated children's book.
 Herb Brooks – former St. Cloud State and U.S. Olympic men's hockey coach.
 Bruce Hyde – cast member of the original Star Trek TV series.
 Jim Pehler – Former member of the Minnesota House of Representatives for 18 years.

See also

 List of colleges and universities in Minnesota

Notes

References

External links

 
 St. Cloud State Athletics website

 
Public universities and colleges in Minnesota
Buildings and structures in St. Cloud, Minnesota
Educational institutions established in 1869
Education in Stearns County, Minnesota
Tourist attractions in Stearns County, Minnesota
1869 establishments in Minnesota